Ludovico Maria Nitoglia (born 27 October 1983) is an Italian former rugby union player. He played as a Wing.
  
With Calvisano, Nitoglia won two Italian rugby championships in 2005 and 2008. He plays for Benetton Treviso in the Pro14, since 2010/11 to 2015/16, when he finished his career.

He had 17 caps for Italy, from 2004 to 2006, without scoring. He played at the Six Nations Championship in 2005 and 2006, for 10 caps. He wasn't called for the 2007 Rugby World Cup and since then never returned to the national team, despite several callings.

References

External links
Ludovico Nitoglia Statistics
Ludovico Nitoglia International Statistics

1983 births
Living people
Sportspeople from Rome
Italian rugby union players
Italy international rugby union players
Benetton Rugby players
Rugby Calvisano players
Rugby union wings
21st-century Italian people